Hemilienardia purpurascens is a species of sea snail, a marine gastropod mollusk in the family Raphitomidae.

Description
The length of the shell attains 5 mm.

The shell is rose-red to violaceous, with a central white band. The outer lip is 5-6 toothed within.

Distribution
This marine species occurs off Samoa.

References

 Wiedrick S.G. (2017). Aberrant geomorphological affinities in four conoidean gastropod genera, Clathurella Carpenter, 1857 (Clathurellidae), Lienardia Jousseaume, 1884 (Clathurellidae), Etrema Hedley, 1918 (Clathurellidae) and Hemilienardia Boettger, 1895 (Raphitomidae), with the descriptionof fourteen new Hemilienardia species from the Indo-Pacific. The Festivus. special issue: 2-45.

External links
 

purpurascens
Gastropods described in 1871